Raiamas buchholzi is a species of ray-finned fish in the genus Raiamas.

References 

Raiamas
Fish described in 1876
Taxa named by Wilhelm Peters